United States v. Fuentes, 105 F.3d 487 (9th Cir. 1997), was a 1997 case in which the U.S. Court of Appeals for the Ninth Circuit ruled that "Mere refusal to consent to a stop or search does not give rise to reasonable suspicion or probable cause." The case involved a Terry stop at an airport of a suspected drug smuggler, and his subsequent flight attempt from Drug Enforcement Administration agents that, along with other suspicious factors, did give the officers probable cause to arrest him.

References

External links
 

United States Court of Appeals for the Ninth Circuit cases
United States Fourth Amendment case law
1997 in United States case law